Bardcore or tavernwave is a musical microgenre that became popular in 2020, consisting of medieval-inspired remakes of popular songs.

History 
In December 2017, before the term bardcore was widely known, a medieval version of "Toxicity" by System of a Down was published on YouTube by Algal the Bard. By 2020, it had achieved a few million views.

The Guardian dates the origin of bardcore as a distinct trend to 20 April 2020, during the COVID-19 lockdown, when 27-year-old German YouTuber Cornelius Link released "Astronomia (Medieval Style)". The track is a remake of Tony Igy's 2010 electronic dance track "Astronomia", which had gained widespread attention as the soundtrack to the coffin dance meme.

Link followed this a few weeks later with a medieval-style instrumental version of Foster the People's "Pumped Up Kicks", which Canadian YouTuber Hildegard von Blingin' (a play on the name of the medieval composer Hildegard von Bingen) then re-released with an added vocal track using a medieval-style adaptation of the original lyrics. By the end of June, both versions had reached 4 million views. Hildegard von Blingin' has also covered Lady Gaga's "Bad Romance", Radiohead's "Creep", Dolly Parton's "Jolene", Lana Del Rey's "Summertime Sadness" and Gotye's "Somebody That I Used to Know", changing the rhythm and lyrics to fit the genre.

Wu Tang Clan endorsed Bardcore artist 'Beedle the Bardcore' by reposting his cover of their track C.R.E.A.M on their official YouTube channel.

The trend was joined by other YouTubers, including Latvian band Auļi, Graywyck, Constantine Bard and Samus Ordicus. Elmira Tanatarova in i-D suggests bardcore "carries with it the weight of years of memes made about the medieval era, and the bleak darkness of that time period that appeals to Gen Z's existential humour." The artwork for bardcore songs are frequently medieval representations of the song being covered, often in the style of the Bayeux Tapestry or illuminated manuscripts.

In October 2020, Scott Mills featured tracks by prominent Bardcore artists Beedle The Bardcore, Hildegard Von Blingin', and Stantough (covered Harry Styles' "Watermelon Sugar") on his prime time BBC Radio 1 show.

See also 

 Cottagecore
 Hauntology
 Nightcore

Notes

References 

Musical subcultures
Internet memes introduced in 2020
21st-century music genres